The National Kidney Foundation, Inc. (NKF) is a voluntary health organization in the United States, headquartered in New York City, with over 30 local offices across the country. Its mission is to prevent kidney and urinary tract diseases, improve the health and well-being of individuals and families affected by these diseases, and increase the availability of all organs for transplantation. NKF is the largest, most comprehensive, and longstanding patient-centric organization dedicated to the awareness, prevention and treatment of kidney disease in the United States.

Activities 
The organization's activities focus on awareness, prevention and treatment. Initiatives include public and professional education, kidney health screenings, research, and patient services.

The National Kidney Foundation publishes a number of scientific journals including the American Journal of Kidney Diseases, Advances in Chronic Kidney Disease and the Journal of Renal Nutrition.  The NKF also publishes the Kidney Dialysis Outcomes Quality Initiative KDOQI, a comprehensive set of clinical practice guidelines.

The NKF has been a vocal advocate for increasing some forms of kidney transplantation, though it opposes organ donations wherein donors are compensated for their donation. Some have accused it of trying to stifle public discussion on this subject.

The National Kidney Foundation annually conducts the Spring Clinical Meetings as its premier educational conference.  It has over 20 years of experience providing continuing education to the kidney healthcare community. The Spring Clinical Meetings have educated over 55,000 professionals, delivered over 2,500 interactive sessions, and offered over 3,200 hours of continuing education credits.

On World Kidney Day, the foundation sponsors KEEP Healthy screenings around the United States. NKF holds hundreds of kidney-health screenings throughout the year to identify individuals who are at risk for chronic kidney disease.

The National Kidney Foundation does not, nor have they ever, had a program that provides access to dialysis machines in exchange for pull tabs on beverage cans. This rumor has existed since at least the 1970s; however, the foundation itself have denied this, noting that 80 percent of the cost of dialysis in the United States is usually covered by Medicare.

Fundraising 
To raise funds for its programs, the National Kidney Foundation organizes a national car-donation program called Kidney Cars, run via Insurance Auto Auctions and their One Car One Difference auto donation program, Kidney Walks in major US cities, and the NKF Golf Classic which culminates in a tournament at Pebble Beach.  Danny Mason, late golf coach at Texas Tech University in Lubbock and a transplant recipient, played in three tournaments.

See also
 Nephrology
 Dialysis Patient Citizens

References

External links
 National Kidney Foundation website

Voluntary health agencies of the United States
Non-profit organizations based in New York City
Kidney organizations
Medical and health organizations based in New York (state)